Subasinghe Mudiyanselage Tikiri Banda Subasinghe (14 August 1913 – 10 August 1995) was a Sri Lankan statesman. He was the 7th Speaker of the Parliament of Sri Lanka and Sri Lankan Ambassador to the Soviet Union He also served as Parliamentary Secretary to the Minister of Defence and External Affairs and Minister of Industries and Scientific Affairs.

Life
While studying at the London School of Economics, Subasinghe attended the 5th Pan-African Congress, held in Manchester in October 1945, and helped to organize the All-Colonial Peoples' Conferences held in London around the same time. A founding member of the Lanka Sama Samaja Party (LSSP), Subasinghe entered parliament contesting the Bingiriya seat at the 1947 Parliamentary general elections.

With the 1956 general elections, he was appointed as Parliamentary Secretary to the Minister of External Affairs and Defence in the S. W. R. D. Bandaranaike cabinet. In 1960, he was unanimously elected Speaker of Parliament following the general elections in the short lived UNP led coalition government defeating veteran Speaker Sir. Albert F. Peiris both of whom represented from North Western Province.

Subasinghe was a prominent figure in the Suriya-Mal Movement which became the springboard for the Marxist and anti-imperialist movements in the country. He had two brothers (Vincent and Tudor Subasinghe) and two sisters.

See also 
Sri Lankan Non Career Diplomats

References

External links
Subasinghe, Subasinghe Mudiyanselage Tikiri Banda
Speaker of the Parliament

1913 births
1995 deaths
Ambassadors of Sri Lanka to the Soviet Union
Government ministers of Sri Lanka
Industries ministers of Sri Lanka
Lanka Sama Samaja Party politicians
Members of the 1st Parliament of Ceylon
Members of the 2nd Parliament of Ceylon
Members of the 3rd Parliament of Ceylon
Members of the 4th Parliament of Ceylon
Members of the 6th Parliament of Ceylon
Members of the 7th Parliament of Ceylon
Parliamentary secretaries of Ceylon
Sinhalese politicians
Speakers of the Parliament of Sri Lanka